Stephen Morgan Etnier (September 11, 1903 – November 7, 1984) was an American realist painter, painting for six decades.  His work is distinguished by a mixture of realism and luminism, favoring industrial and working scenes, but always imbued with atmospheric light.  Geographically, his career spanned the length of the eastern Atlantic and beyond.

Childhood and education
Stephen Etnier  was born in September, 1903 in York, Pennsylvania. From 1915 to 1922 he attended the Haverford and Hill schools in Pennsylvania and Roxbury Tutoring School in Connecticut. He matriculated into Yale University class of 1926, transferring to Yale Art School in December 1922. Re-entering Yale University in 1923 he was later dismissed for poor grades. He entered Haverford College in 1924 and transferred to the Pennsylvania Academy of Fine Arts, where he studied for four years.

From 1925 through 1929 he studied and apprenticed under the artists Henry Breckinridge, Rockwell Kent and John Carroll.

Early career
Drawing inspiration from The Moon and Sixpence,  Somerset Maugham's novel based on the life of the painter Paul Gauguin, Etnier pursued painting, launching his career with a solo exhibition at Dudensing Galleries, New York City in 1931. He soon moved to New York's Milch Gallery, where he would remain until the 1960s.

Etnier's early work of 1930s and 1940s provides a record of his life at the time.  His work shows street scenes in his home state of Pennsylvania, waterfronts from his travels to Haiti and the Bahamas, (and made while sailing the Eastern Seaboard aboard his 70-foot sailboat, Morgana), aerial perspectives created as he learned to fly, and dramatic Maine landscapes, painted while he renovated a stately 1862 home, "Gilbert Head".

Gilbert Head was on Long Island, Maine at the opening of the Kennebec River and across from Fort Popham and Popham Beach. Etnier and his wife Betsy lived on the Morgana for two years while they renovated the house. Her account of these years, On Gilbert Head, was published in 1937.

In 1938 he executed the mural "Waiting for the Mail," installed at the U.S. Post Office in Spring Valley, New York, and listed on the National Register of Historic Places in 1988. In 1940 he painted a second mural, "Mail for New England" at the Boston, MA. Everett Branch Post Office. In 2010 this mural was restored and reinstalled at the Clarendon Street Post Office in Boston.

Military service
In 1941, at the age of thirty-eight, Etnier suspended his painting career to serve in the United States Navy. In May 1942, Etnier was commissioned as a lieutenant and assigned as commanding officer of the USS Mizpah, a North Atlantic convoy escort ship.  In 1944, he was reassigned to the USS Tourmaline in Boston, and later to the USS General Omar Bundy in San Francisco.  He completed his tour of duty in 1945.

Later career
Etnier purchased land in South Harpswell, Maine in 1948 to build "Old Cove", his dream house and studio. Designed in collaboration with Portland, Maine architect James Saunders, the home featured a porch cantilevered over the ocean, north-facing windows for his studio, and a living room overlooking the ocean and framed by Mondrian-inspired window frames. Named for the private cove it overlooked, the home served as the foundation for a productive and increasingly serene period in Etnier's career. Old Cove was sold to new owners in 2014 and subsequently demolished.

The 1950s and 1960s mark a maturing, accomplished style in Etnier's work. Although still traveling south most winters in his boat, his life took a more domestic turn as he re-adopted Maine as his permanent home and married his fourth wife, Samuella "Brownie" Brown Rose. They were married for thirty-three years and had two sons. During those years, he painted daily, exhibited widely and enjoyed popular support, artistic awards and media attention.

Etnier's work became more architectural, marked by stark geometry, light and shadow, impressionistic figures and accents of color and modern culture. He adopted an artist's discipline of rising early and painting each morning (learned first from Rockwell Kent ), seeking to capture the essence of Maine waterfronts and landscapes and the effects of light. The study of sunlight and water fascinated Etnier until the end of his career.

On November 7, 1984, Stephen Etnier died at Old Cove, comforted by his two sons.

Exhibitions and awards
Etnier exhibited frequently in galleries in Pennsylvania, Maine, New York and Dallas. His work appears in the permanent collections of the Metropolitan Museum of Art, Boston Museum of Fine Arts and other museums across the United States. Acclaim includes his election as an academician by the National Academy of Design  and a retrospective exhibit at the Farnsworth Museum in Rockland, Maine in 1953; receipt of the Saltus Award by the National Academy of Design in 1955; a solo exhibition at York Junior College in York, Pennsylvania and the Samuel F. B. Morse gold medal from the National Academy of Design in 1964; and a solo exhibition at the Bristol Art Museum in Bristol, Rhode Island in 1965.  In 1969, Etnier was awarded honorary doctorates of fine arts from Bates College and Bowdoin College in Maine.  In that year, he also began his association with Midtown Gallery in New York City.

Posthumous retrospective exhibitions were mounted at the Portland Museum of Art in 1998 and at the Historical Society of York County in 1989.

Marriages and children
Stephen Etnier married Mathilde Gray, the daughter of John Lathrop Gray, Sr. and Harriet Hamilton Tyng of Greenwich, Connecticut in 1926. They had two daughters; Suzanne Mathilde Etnier, born July 6, 1927, and Penelope Royall Etnier born July 17, 1929. He married Elizabeth Morgan Jay of Westbury, New York in 1933. They had two daughters: Stephanie Jay Etnier was born September 8, 1936, and Elizabeth Victoria Etnier was born May 1, 1940. Etnier's third wife was Jane Walden Pearce, who died soon after they were married in 1948. He married Samuella "Brownie" Brown Rose in 1950. They had two sons; John Stephen Etnier, born August 26, 1953, and David Morrison Etnier, born August 29, 1955. Etnier's fifth and final marriage came in the last months of his life: he married Marcia Hall of Harpswell in 1983. They later divorced.

References

Notes

Sources
   (Retrospective exhibition catalog with biography and timeline)
  (essay: "You Should Paint what You Love: Stephen Etnier" pp. 31–36)
 
   (Retrospective exhibition catalog with biographical essay)
 
  (privately published autobiography)

External links
 Stephen Etnier website
 Biographical essay
 Listing of exhibitions and awards
 Smithsonian Archive oral history interview
 National Academy of Design biography page
 Google press archive
 "Stephen Etnier: Painter of Coasts, Sailor of Seas", Maine Boats, Homes & Harbors magazine
 WorldCat listing of exhibition catalogs

20th-century American painters
American male painters
Modern painters
Painters from Maine
People from York, Pennsylvania
1903 births
1984 deaths
People from Harpswell, Maine
Painters from Pennsylvania
Pennsylvania Academy of the Fine Arts alumni
20th-century American male artists